Isasicursor (meaning "Isasi's runner" after Marcelo Pablo Isasi) is a genus of elasmarian ornithopod from the Chorrillo Formation from Santa Cruz Province in Argentina. The type and only species is Isasicursor santacrucensis. It was a contemporary of the sauropod Nullotitan which was described in the same paper.

Discovery and naming 
In 1980, geologist Francisco E. Nullo noticed the presence of sauropod bones on a hillside of the Estancia Alta Vista, south of the Centinela River in the Santa Cruz province of Argentina. He reported these finds to then-prominent paleontologist José Bonaparte. Bonaparte dug up a large sauropod cervical vertebra in 1981. The old site was relocated and new excavations were carried out between 13 and 17 January and 14 to 19 March 2019, and a new site was discovered on the Estancia La Anita. The sauropod finds were named as the new genus Nullotitan but bones from a new ornithopod were also discovered by technician Marcelo Pablo Isasi, which laid close to some mosasaur teeth.

In 2019, the type species Isasicursor santacrucensis was named and described by Fernando Emilio Novas, Federico Lisandro Agnolin, Sebastian Rozadilla, Alexis Mauro Aranciaga-Rolando Federico Brisson-Egli, Matias Javier Motta, Mauricio Cerroni, Martin Dario Ezcurra, Agustín Guillermo Martinelli, Julia S D´Angelo, Gerardo Alvarez-Herrera, Adriel Roberto Gentil, Sergio Bogan, Nicolás Roberto Chimento, Jordi Alexis García-Marsà, Gastón Lo Coco, Sergio Eduardo Miquel, Fátima F. Brito, Ezequiel Iganacio Vera, Valeria Susana Perez Loinaze, Mariela Soledad Fernández and Leonardo Salgado. The large number of authors is a consequence of the fact that the article described the entire fauna in which every expert contributed their part. The genus name honors Isasi and connects its name with a Latin cursor, "runner". The species designation refers to its provenance from Santa Cruz province.

The holotype, MPM 21525, was found in a layer of the upper Chorrillo Formation that dates from the Maastrichtian. It consists of the upper side of a left shin.

Different bones from the same location were designated as paratypes. These were MPM 21526, a piece of a cervical vertebra; MPM 21527: two middle vertebrae; MPM 21528: a sacrum minus the third sacral vertebra; MPM 21529: thirty anterior, middle and posterior vertebrae of different individuals; MPM 21530: the bottom of a right shoulder blade; MPM 21531: the lower end of a left humerus; MPM 21532: the main body of a left pubic bone; MPM 21533: a set of young animals of which the upper side of a right thigh bone, three upper sides of a left thigh bone, three lower sides of a left thigh bone and two shafts of a thigh bone; MPM 21534: the lower end of a tibia; MPM 21535: the ends of a second metatarsal; MPM 21536: the lower end of a third left metatarsal leg; MPM 21537: the ends of a fourth metatarsal; MPM 21538: the fourth metatarsal bone of a young animal; MPM 21539L: the first foot of the first toe, first foot of the second toe and the second and third foot of the fourth toe; MPM 21540: six foot claws; and MPM 21541: the second and third toes of a young animal.

The finds represent at least four individuals. The fossils are part of the collection of the Museo Regional Provincial Padre Molina.

Description

Size and distinctive features 
The describers were able to identify five distinctive features. They are autapomorphies, unique derived properties. The sacrum is curved downwards. The first and second sacral vertebra are connected to each other via a pin-and-hole connection. The crista cnemialis of the tibia is thickened and highly upward excellent. On the upper surface of the tibia, the outer rear lobe has an additional protrusion that faces forward and faces. The second metatarsal has a well on the outside for the joint capsule that is higher than normal.

Skeleton 
The cervical vertebra is keeled and flattened on the side. The amphicoelous vertebrae show no special details. The sacrum has six sacral vertebrae and is fairly robust. It is exceptional that the sphere curves downwards. The keeled first sacral vertebra is greatly widened sideways. The second sacral vertebra has a keel that extends into a protrusion that fits into a hole in the oval back facet of the first vertebra; their contact is normally flat. The fourth vertebra has a longitudinal trough on the underside with only a low ledge at the front. The front facet is square, the back facet hexagonal. The fifth vertebra has the same morphology from the bottom. It is again oval on the front but rectangular on the back. The sixth vertebra also sticks with a pin in the fifth. The tail vertebrae are slightly amphicoel and have length trough. Lateral ridges increase towards the rear, so that eventually a hexagonal cross-section is created.

With the shoulder blade, the cavity above the shoulder joint is round and shallow, as with Gasparinisaura and Trinisaura . The front leg is relatively long but shorter than the rear leg. The corridor was probably optional two-legged: at high speed the animal walked on only the hind legs. The fact that the front leg was not used for a powerful sale is clear from the delta-detectoral comb of the humerus that is reduced to a low ledge. The outside thereof is intersected by numerous roughenings for tendons. The humerus bends outwards. Both of these characteristics are typically elasmaric.

The pubis apparently did not touch the process obturatorius of the Ischium which means that the foramen obturatum is not closed but open downwards.

For the femur, the trochanter major at the top is convex and on the inside separated by a groove from the front narrow trochanter minor. The front groove is not well developed between the lower joint nodules. The inner nodule is not widened outwards. With the tibia, the upward widening of the crista cnemialis, above the joint surface, gives it a triangular profile. This comb is also thickened across, with a round top. The crista lateralisis also thick, with a straight front edge. The triangular outer lobe of the upper surface has a special obliquely forward projection. The lower outer leg style has an elongated comb that forms an elevation in the middle. The inner post is not bent forward. In the young animals, all these characteristics are less pronounced on the lower part of the tibia.

The second metatarsal is flattened at the top and thickened from front to back, a synapomorphy of the Elasmaria. However, the thickening remains limited. With the third metatarsal, the innermost lower joint bump is the largest. With the remarkably robust fourth metatarsal leg, the upper outer edge forms a sharp ledge; at Talenkauen, Morrosaurus and the Styracosterna this piece is completed. The bottom surface forms a parallelogram whose rear edge protrudes more inwards but is curled outwards. The toe legs are sturdy and short, also from front to back, a distracted feature. The foot claws are not hoof-shaped but sharp, albeit with a flat bottom.

Phylogeny
Isasicursor was placed in the Elasmaria , although without a precise cladistic analysis, so its exact relationships remain unclear. If this placement is correct, the animal is the youngest known iguanodont, and by extension, ornithopod, known from the Southern Hemisphere.

Palaeobiology

Isasicursor was a herbivore. The describers consider it likely that the Elasmaria lived together with the relatively larger Hadrosauroidea, with the two groups belonging in different niches, though hadrosauroids were not found at the site. The presence of Nullotitan suggests niche partitioning with giant sauropods. Isasicursor was probably hunted by Maip, possibly the largest Patagonian megaraptorid. 

The describers saw the remains of young and old individuals being found together as evidence that Isasicursor lived in herds.

References 

Ornithopods
Campanian life
Maastrichtian life
Late Cretaceous dinosaurs of South America
Cretaceous Argentina
Fossils of Argentina
Fossil taxa described in 2019
Ornithischian genera